Tekstilshchiki is a rural locality (a settlement) in Pyatovskoye Rural Settlement, Totemsky District, Vologda Oblast, Russia. The population was 653 as of 2010. There are 7 streets.

Geography 
Tekstilshchiki is located 5 km southeast of Totma (the district's administrative centre) by road. Ust-Yedenga is the nearest rural locality.

References 

Rural localities in Tarnogsky District